Clint the Stranger, also known as Clint the Nevada's Loner, Nevada Clint and Clint, the Lonely Nevadan (in original Italian, Clint il solitario), is a 1967 Italian Spaghetti Western starring George Martin. A sequel entitled The Return of Clint the Stranger would follow in 1972.

Releases
Wild East released the film on a limited edition R0 NTSC DVD in a double feature with its sequel The Return of Clint the Stranger with the alternate title Clint the Nevada's Loner, present on the cover art. It is now out-of-print.

Cast
 George Martin as Clint Harrison
 Marianne Koch as Julie Harrison 
 Gerhard Riedmann as Bill O'Brien 
 Pinkas Braun as Don Shannon 
 Xan das Bolas as Simpson 
 Osvaldo Genazzani
 Beni Deus as McKInley 
 Francisco José Huetos as Tom Harrison 
 Remo De Angelis 
 Fernando Sancho as Ross 
 Renato Baldini as Contadino 
 Walter Barnes as Walter Shannon 
 Paolo Gozlino as Dave Shannon 
 Luis Barboo 
 Gustavo Re as Peabody

References

External links
 

1967 films
1967 Western (genre) films
Spaghetti Western films
Spanish Western (genre) films
West German films
1960s Italian-language films
Films directed by Alfonso Balcázar
Films scored by Nora Orlandi
1960s Italian films